A cyclic number is a natural number n such that n and φ(n) are coprime. Here φ is Euler's totient function. An equivalent definition is that a number n is cyclic if and only if any group of order n is cyclic. 

Any prime number is clearly cyclic. All cyclic numbers are square-free.
Let n = p1 p2 … pk where the pi are distinct primes, then φ(n) = (p1 − 1)(p2 − 1)...(pk – 1). If no pi divides any (pj – 1), then n and φ(n) have no common (prime) divisor, and n is cyclic.

The first cyclic numbers are 1, 2, 3, 5, 7, 11, 13, 15, 17, 19, 23, 29, 31, 33, 35, 37, 41, 43, 47, 51, 53, 59, 61, 65, 67, 69, 71, 73, 77, 79, 83, 85, 87, 89, 91, 95, 97, 101, 103, 107, 109, 113, 115, 119, 123, 127, 131, 133, 137, 139, 141, 143, 145, 149, ... .

References

Number theory